Coolspring Township is one of twenty-one townships in LaPorte County, Indiana. As of the 2010 census, its population was 14,718 and it contained 6,661 housing units.

Coolspring Township was established in 1836.

Geography

The headwaters of the Little Calumet River is located within Coolspring Township, at Red Mill County Park.

The unincorporated town of Waterford is located within the township.

References

External links
 Indiana Township Association
 United Township Association of Indiana

Townships in LaPorte County, Indiana
Townships in Indiana